Yona Ndabila (born  11 September 1985) is a Tanzanian former professional footballer who played as a striker and made one appearance for the Tanzania national team.

Nepal

Released from Kagera Sugar in 2012, Ndabila finished as second top scorer in the Nepalese top tier with Saraswoti Youth Club with 16 goals, including a brace to beat Boudha 2-1, visiting his parents in Mbeya after the season's end.

Plying his trade with Manang Marshyangdi Club of the Nepalese top tier, Ndabila scored a goal to help them reach the final of the 2013 Ncell Cup in what was seen as an impeccable performance on his part. and a hat-trick in the semi-final of the 2013 Bhutan King's Cup.

International
Ndabila was capped with Tanzania national team, with one 2008 appearance against Yemen.

References 

1985 births
Living people
Tanzanian footballers
Tanzania international footballers
Tanzanian expatriate footballers
Expatriate footballers in Nepal
Tanzanian expatriate sportspeople in Nepal
Prisons F.C. players
Moro United F.C. players
Mtibwa Sugar F.C. players
Kagera Sugar F.C. players
Saraswoti Youth Club players
Manang Marshyangdi Club players
Association football forwards
Tanzanian Premier League players